Wellwood Cemetery is a Jewish cemetery in West Babylon, New York.  It was established as the annex to Beth David Cemetery in Elmont, New York. The cemetery comprises many sections, each under the auspices of a synagogue, landsmanschaft, or group such as the Brooklyn Jewish Postal Workers Union.  Each of these is marked, most commonly by a stone arch or a pair of stone columns. Many of the landsmanshaft have dedicated Holocaust monuments to the victims of the Nazis in their ancestral town.  Examples include Baranovichi, Belarus; Ioannina, Greece; Pilica, Poland; Sokołów Podlaski, Poland; and Burshtyn, Ukraine.

Several well-known rabbis are buried here. Kehillas Belz of New York has a section within the Beth Moses section of Wellwood Cemetery.  The Belz Kehilla still dedicated (Mekudash) this section when the previous Belz Rebbe Reb Aharon was still alive.

Notable burials
 Maury Allen – sportswriter, actor, and columnist
 Jules Bass - television producer, director, author and lyricist
 Craig Gilbert – film writer, producer, and director
 Danny Leiner – film director
 Lucy Ozarin – one of the first women psychiatrists commissioned in the US Navy and one of seven women Navy psychiatrists who served during World War II
 Leo F. Rayfiel – former United States House of Representatives and United States District Court judge
 Julius and Ethel Rosenberg – convicted of conspiracy to commit espionage and executed
 Lester Wolff – Former member of the United States House of Representatives

References

External links
 
 
  

Belarusian-Jewish culture in New York (state)
Cemeteries in Suffolk County, New York
Greek-American culture in New York (state)
Greek-Jewish culture in the United States
Jewish cemeteries in New York (state)
Jews and Judaism in Suffolk County, New York
Polish-Jewish culture in New York (state)
Ukrainian-Jewish culture in New York (state)